Hugo Valentin Paul Genestet (born 2 March 1992) is a French field hockey player who plays as a midfielder for Belgian club Waterloo Ducks and the French national team.

Club career
Genestet played for Saint Germain in France before he joined Leuven in Belgium in 2014. He played there until 2016 when he returned to France. In 2018 he joined Daring in the Belgian Hockey League. After one season he left Daring for the Waterloo Ducks.

International career

Under–21
Genestet was a member of the French U–21 side from 2010 through to 2013. In 2013, he was a member of the team at the FIH Junior World Cup in New Delhi. At the tournament, the team made history by securing France's first medal at the event, taking home silver.

Senior national team
Genestet also debuted for the France national team in 2010, and has been a member of the team since. He represented France at the 2018 World Cup. He is the current captain of the national team.

References

External links

1992 births
Living people
French male field hockey players
Male field hockey midfielders
2018 Men's Hockey World Cup players
KHC Leuven players
Waterloo Ducks H.C. players
Men's Belgian Hockey League players
Place of birth missing (living people)